The 1981 Kansas Jayhawks football team represented the University of Kansas in the Big Eight Conference during the 1981 NCAA Division I-A football season. In their seventh season under head coach Don Fambrough, the Jayhawks compiled an 8–4 record (4–3 against conference opponents), tied for third place in the conference, and were outscored by opponents by a combined total of 195 to 188. They played their home games at Memorial Stadium in Lawrence, Kansas.

The team's statistical leaders included Frank Seurer with 1,199 passing yards, Garfield Taylor with 728 rushing yards, and Wayne Capers with 629 receiving yards. David Lawrence and Greg Smith were the team captains.

Schedule

References

Kansas
Kansas Jayhawks football seasons
Kansas Jayhawks football